, or Godzillaland, refers to a series of Japanese children's educational television series produced by Toho and based on the Godzilla franchise. The first series, a trivia show titled , aired on TV Tokyo in 1992. The series was intended to promote the film Godzilla vs. Mothra, and features both live-action and chibi-style animated segments. It also features musical numbers, including one that doubles as an aerobic exercise. Toho then produced a second series, which aired in 1993 as a promotion for Godzilla vs. Mechagodzilla II.

Get Going! Godzilland is aimed at teaching children how to read the hiragana alphabet, how to count, and how to perform addition and subtraction.

References

External links
 Adventure! Godzilland on IMDb

1992 Japanese television series debuts
1994 anime OVAs
1996 anime OVAs
Comedy anime and manga
Godzilla (franchise)
Godzilla television series
Japanese children's television series
Japanese television series with live action and animation
TV Tokyo original programming